Amuowghli-ye Sofla (also romanized as ‘Amūowghlī-ye Soflá and ‘Amū Owghlī-ye Soflá; also known as Amū Oghlī, ‘Amū Owghlī Pā’īn, and ‘Amūowghlī-ye Pā’īn) is a village in Charuymaq-e Sharqi Rural District, Shadian District, Charuymaq County, East Azerbaijan Province, Iran. At the 2006 census, its population was 339, in 57 families.

References 

Populated places in Charuymaq County